Kfir Eizenstein (born February 18, 1993) is a former Israeli footballer.

References

External links
 

1993 births
Living people
Israeli footballers
Hapoel Tel Aviv F.C. players
Maccabi Ironi Bat Yam F.C. players
Hapoel Ashkelon F.C. players
Maccabi Jaffa F.C. players
Israeli Premier League players
Liga Leumit players
Footballers from Tel Aviv
Association football defenders